Paul Miller is a former American football coach. He served as the head football coach at St. Olaf College in Northfield, Minnesota (1997–2001), Hamline University in St. Paul, Minnesota (2005–2006), and the University of Minnesota, Crookston (2012), compiling a career college football coaching record of 28–53.

Head coaching record

College

References

Year of birth missing (living people)
Living people
Hamline Pipers football coaches
Minnesota Golden Gophers football coaches
Minnesota Crookston Golden Eagles football coaches
Minnesota Morris Cougars football players
St. Olaf Oles football coaches
High school football coaches in Minnesota
Minnesota State University, Mankato alumni
People from South St. Paul, Minnesota
Players of American football from Minnesota